Varanes is a Roman name of Persian origin, derived by the name Bahram.

 Varanes (consul 410), Roman consul in 410;
 Varanes (consul 456), Roman consul in 456.